Isikeli Uluinairai Mataitoga is a Fijian diplomat and the incumbent Ambassador of Fiji to Japan, concurrently the non-resident ambassador to the Philippines and Russia. He presented his credentials to Japanese Emperor Akihito at the Tokyo Imperial Palace on 13 January 2010, to Russian President Dmitry Medvedev at the Moscow Kremlin on 5 February 2010, and then to Philippines President Benigno Aquino III at the Malacañang Palace on 10 January 2013. Prior to his appointment, Mataitoga was Solicitor General of Fiji from 1993 to 1997, and subsequently a judge of the High Court of Fiji. He was also Acting Minister for Foreign Affairs from 2006 to 2007.

References

External links
 Mutual respect marks bilateral relationship on the 50th Anniversary of Fiji's Independence

Living people
Ambassadors of Fiji to Japan
Ambassadors of Fiji to the Philippines
Ambassadors of Fiji to Russia
20th-century Fijian judges
Foreign Ministers of Fiji
I-Taukei Fijian people
Solicitors-General of Fiji
Year of birth missing (living people)
21st-century Fijian judges